Jansonia is a genus of flower chafer belonging to the family scarab beetles, containing the single species Jansonia anceps.

Cetoniinae
Monotypic beetle genera